Anna is a 2021 Italian television series written and directed by Niccolò Ammaniti.

It is an adaptation of Ammaniti's post-apocalyptic novel of the same name, originally published in 2015.

Cast

Main cast
Giulia Dragotto as Anna Salemi, a 13-years-old Sicilian girl
Alessandro Pecorella as Astor, Anna's little brother
Elena Lietti as Maria Grazia, Anna and Astor's mother
Roberta Mattei as Katia, a mysterious woman known as "Picciridduna"
Giovanni Mavilla as Pietro, a teenage boy who befriends Anna
Clara Tramontano as Angelica, a teenage girl who rules the gang of the "Blues" and the "Whites"
Viviana Mocciaro as Anna as a child
Nicola Mangano as Astor as a baby

Guest cast
Corrado Fortuna as Damiano, Astor's father
Giovanni Calcagno as Marco Salemi, Anna's father
Chiara Muscato as Anna's teacher
Danilo and Dario Di Vita as the twin brothers Mario and Paolo
Tommaso Ragno as the twins' father
Miriam Dalmazio as Ginevra
Matilde Sofia Fazio as Angelica as a child
Sara Ciocca as "Snow White"
Oro De Commarque as "Cinderella"
Elisa Miccoli as "Red Riding Hood"
Ludovico Colnago as Pietro as a child
Adele Perna as Pietro's mother
Vincenzo Masci as Nucci
Nicola Nocella as Saverio
Sergio Albelli as the Pope

See also
List of Italian television series

References

External links
 

Italian television series